Frankford is a neighborhood in the Northeast section of Philadelphia situated about six miles (10 km) northeast of Center City. Although its borders are vaguely defined, the neighborhood is bounded roughly by the original course of Frankford Creek on the south to Castor Avenue on the southwest, to Cheltenham Avenue on the north, and to Torresdale Avenue on the east. Adjacent neighborhoods are Bridesburg, Kensington, Juniata, Oxford Circle, Summerdale, and Wissinoming.  

Historically, Frankford had an unofficial division separating Frankford (proper) from East Frankford, which encompassed the area east of Frankford Avenue. The division divided the community first along racial lines, with African Americans to the east of Frankford Avenue and Caucasians to the west. As the community has become less homogeneous, the division is more of a vestige of the past.

History
The village of Frankford was established by the Quakers in about 1682 in an area already occupied by Swedes and Germans. The land known as the Manor of Frank was purchased by the Society of Free Traders, a group of Quaker businessmen in England. The original settlers were Henry Waddy, Thomas Fairman, Robert Adam, and Edward Seary. The village very likely took its name from the title of the Frankfurt Company, which took up ground there, along what is now known as Frankford Creek, in the lower part of Oxford Township. 

Frankford Creek's upper tributaries were the Tacony Creek and the Wingohocking Creek. Frankford was an early suburb of the town of Philadelphia. William Penn forged a trail through the village running from the original town (now Center City) to New York City, passing through Bucks County near the site of his home, Pennsbury Manor. That trail came to be known as "Frankford Pike" (later Frankford Avenue) and was the town's main street.

The village was incorporated into a borough on March 2, 1800, bounded by Leiper Street on the northwest, Little Tacony (or Tackawanna) Creek on the south and east, and Frankford Creek on the west. By an act on April 4, 1831, the boundaries of the borough were extended to include land to the northwest of Leiper Street, the line running along Harrison and Horrocks Streets, to a point on Frankford Creek below Wyoming Avenue. In 1853, the part of Whitehall Borough lying between Torresdale and Frankford Avenues below what is now Whitehall Common was added, to encompass a total of 1.468 square miles. In 1854, the borough was annexed by the city of Philadelphia through the Act of Consolidation, 1854.

Frankford was historically a manufacturing center, beginning with a gristmill constructed in the 1660s. This same mill became famous during the American Revolutionary War due to the heroics of Lydia Darrah.

Before and during the Revolution, two lesser-known grist-mills operated on the creek above the town of Frankford.

In 1771, Robert Morris (a miller) purchased a mill at the junction of the Tacony Creek and Frankford Creek.

On November 25, 1773, after receiving permission to dam the creek from a Quaker named Nicholas Waln, a feme-sole trader named Mary Peters established a small grist mill. She was in a partnership with Richard Whitman of Oxford Township, Philadelphia County.

Frankford also has the distinction of having played a role in the Declaration of Independence. "There is also a tradition that on the afternoon of that day, or possibly a day or two earlier, there was a joyful private celebration of the great event, by Jefferson and others, at the garden-house of a country-seat in Frankford (near Philadelphia), then occupied by Dr. Enoch Edwards, a leading patriot of that time."

Frankford was also the site of a gunpowder mill that became famous because of its association with Oswald Eve and Paul Revere.

In the 19th century, the town became a center for textile production.  Other manufacturing industries also flourished. An early description of industry in 1837:
The borough of Frankford, on the Delaware, is the seat of numerous manufacturing establishments, including several cotton-mills, calico print-works and bleacheries, woollen-mills, iron-works, & etc. Here are also an Arsenal of the United States, and a Lunatic Asylum belonging to the Friends.

The Frankford Arsenal rivaled the Philadelphia Navy Yard during World War II.  It provided over 22,000 jobs and at its peak, produced 8 million bullets per day.

In 1922, the Frankford Elevated Line opened, connecting to the Market Street Elevated to provide rapid-transit access to Center City and West Philadelphia. The terminus of today's SEPTA Market-Frankford Line, now known as the Frankford Transportation Center, became a major transit hub, with connections to bus and trolley routes extending into Northeast Philadelphia. Residents of Frankford live within walking distance of the terminal. SEPTA's elevated train (the "El") runs through the neighborhood above Frankford Avenue.

Although the Frankford Line helped to catapult Frankford Avenue into a major shopping district in the early 20th century, the traditionally working-class neighborhood saw decline in the 1950s as many Philadelphians moved to the suburbs. White flight eventually took its hold on the neighborhood throughout the 1970s and 1980s.  By 1990, over 30% of the storefronts on Frankford Avenue were vacant.  

Since this time, Frankford has seen a push for improvement. In 1993, the Philadelphia City Planning Commission adopted the Frankford Plan as a blueprint for revitalizing the neighborhood.  Although many vacant storefronts remain, businesses catering to new customers have opened in recent years.

Many business owners hope that gentrification of neighborhoods such as Fishtown and Kensington will spread north into Frankford. Others worry that previous attempts at improving Frankford have not been as effective as hoped, with most areas of the neighborhood still suffering from street crime and open-air drug sales. Between 1985 and 1990, a serial killer known as the "Frankford Slasher" murdered several women in the neighborhood. Although several suspects were taken into custody, the actual killer has never been identified.

Notable sites

Museums
Grand Army of the Republic Museum and Library, 4278 Griscom St.
Historical Society of Frankford, established 1905, 1507 Orthodox St.

Churches
The Baptist Worship Center, 4355 Paul St.
St. Bartholomew R.C. Church, 5600 Jackson St.
By Grace Alone Christian Reformed Church, 1300 Dyre Street
Campbell African Methodist Episcopal Church, 1657 Kinsey St., founded 1804
Central United Methodist Church, 4620 Griscom St.
Christ Independent Baptist Church, 1618 Womrath St.
The Church of Jesus Christ of Latter-day Saints, 4610 Frankford Ave.
Sixth Church of Christ, Scientist, 4720 Leiper St.
Crossroads Community Church, 4624 Leiper St.
Faith Assembly of God, 5049 Charles St.
Faith Tabernacle, 1744 Foulkrod St.
Frankford Friends Meeting House, 1500 Orthodox St., established 1684
Frankford Memorial United Methodist Church, 1300 Dyre St.
Hermon Presbyterian Church, 4835 Frankford Ave.
Holy Cross Church of Christ, 1822 Orthodox St.
International Druidic Society, 4455 Frankford Ave.
St. James Lutheran Church, Pratt St. and Castor Ave.
St. Joachim Church, Philadelphia, 1527 Church St., established 1845
St. John Apostolic Church, 4404-06 Paul St.
St. Mark's Church, Frankford, 4442 Frankford Ave., is an Episcopal Church, established 1832
Mar Thoma Church
St. Mary's Malankara Orthodox Syrian Cathedral, 1424 Orthodox St.
Mizpah Seventh-day Adventist Church, 4355 Paul St.
Church Of Christ (Iglesia Ni Cristo), 1676 Ruan St.
By Grace Alone Frankford Fellowship, 4730 Oxford Ave.
New Beginning Church of Philadelphia, 4200 Roosevelt Blvd, 19124
Northeast Baptist Church, 4744 Tackawanna St.
Christ Fellowship Christian Church, 1639 Harrison St., was begun as NORTHEAST BIBLE PRESBYTERIAN CHURCH
The Presbyterian Church of Frankford, 4302 Frankford Ave., dating to 1605, was begun as a German-speaking reformed church
Rehoboth United Methodist Church, 4229 Paul St.
Second Baptist Church of Frankford, 1801 Meadow St.
Second Spanish Baptist Church, 4917 Frankford Ave. (began as North Frankford Baptist Church – given to Second Spanish Baptist in the early 1990s)
Strait Gate Church of Faith and Deliverance, Inc., 4265 Frankford Ave.
St. Thomas United Methodist Church, 4701 Tackawanna St.
St. Valentine's Polish National Church, 2330 Margaret St.
Word of Faith Christian Center, 4355 Paul St.

Schools
The Charter School of Arts & Science: String Theory (formerly Henry R. Edmunds School), 1197 Haworth St.
First Philadelphia Charter School for Literacy, 4300 Tacony St.
Frankford Friends School, 1500 Orthodox St.
Frankford High School, 5000 Oxford Ave.
Frankford Hospital School of Nursing, 4918 Penn St.
Warren G. Harding Middle School, 2000 Wakeling St.
John Marshall School, Sellers and Griscom Sts.
Northwood Academy Charter School, 4621 Castor Ave.
Smedley Elementary School, Bridge and Mulberry Sts.
Allen M. Stearne Elementary School, 1655 Unity St.

Historic sites
 Garden-House, owned by Dr. Enoch Edwards, where Jefferson and others celebrated the passage of the Declaration is present-day Womrath Park. (Demolished)
 Cedar Hill Cemetery, established 1849
 Oswald Eve's gunpowder mill, built 1774. (Demolished)
 Frankford Community Memorial Stadium, opened 1922, site of several games of the Frankford Yellow Jackets professional football team. (Demolished)
 Greenwood Cemetery, established 1869, where Dr. Benjamin Rush kept a summer home in the late 18th century. 
 The Comly Rich House (built 1826), 4276 Orchard Street, was the first house in the United States to receive a mortgage (1831)
 Frankford Avenue, formerly Main Street, and before that the King's Highway

National Register of Historic Places
 William W. Axe School
 Frankford Arsenal
 Friends Hospital, the first private psychiatric hospital in the U.S., founded 1813
 Warren G. Harding Junior High School
 Henry Longfellow School
 John Marshall School
 The John Ruan House, built 1796
 Franklin Smedley School
 James J. Sullivan School
 David Wilmot School

Others
Frankford Hospital
Eastern Regional Medical Center, a facility of Cancer Treatment Centers of America (formerly Parkview Hospital)

Northwood
Within the bounds of Frankford exists an enclave known as Northwood. Northwood is made up almost entirely of pre-World War II twin and single-family dwellings. Northwood is bounded by Harrison Street to the south, Roosevelt Boulevard to the west and Oxford Avenue to the east, its northernmost point being Sanger Street, just below the intersection of Castor Avenue, Roosevelt Blvd (U.S. 1) and Oxford Avenue. However, a more broad definition of Northwood would extend to Adams Avenue on the south, including the location of Northwood Park and the larger mansions on Castor Avenue south of Harrison Street.

Three of Frankford's schools lie within Northwood. Other facilities in Northwood include Frankford High School's War Memorial Stadium, built in honor of area residents who served in World War I, and Baldwin Field, named for local businessman and philanthropist E. A. Baldwin, who had a milk business in Northwood. The field was dedicated on June 3, 1938.

The neighborhood is home to a mostly middle-class population. The neighborhood was also home to former Philadelphia mayor and Representative from the 5th (then 3rd) Congressional District William J. Green, III, and the late Edward R. Becker, former justice on the Third Circuit Court of Appeals for the United States.

Burk Deed Restriction
In 1881, Alfred and Louis Burk founded Louis Burk, Inc., Philadelphia meat packers, and also built Atlantic City's original Steel Pier in 1898. Several other brothers were engaged in this family-run business. (Another brother, Henry Burk, was a well-known local politician.)

As real-estate investors and developers in Philadelphia, they bought and sold large parcels of land in Northwood. To protect the integrity of the neighborhood, Louis Burk placed several various deed restrictions upon many of the tracts he sold. One variant form:

BURK DEED RESTRICTION, AS TO THE 900 BLOCK OF HERBERT STREET – 

RESTRICTIONS as in Deed Book J.M.H.  317 page 63

UNDER AND SUBJECT nevertheless that no bldg. shall be erected or built or permitted to
be erected or built upon any of the hereby granted tract of land or any part thereof except
for the use as a private dwelling or a private garage in connection with a dwelling nor shall
any bldg. thereon erected be converted or used for any other purpose that there shall be
wooden division fences between subdivision of the hereby granted tracts of land that
divisions may be made by an iron fence not to exceed 4' in height or a suitable hedge not
to exceed that height and that no dwelling shall be erected which shall cost less than
$2500 to construct that no garage shall be built within 75' of the bldg. line of either sd.
(said) Herbert Street or sd. Ramona Avenue nor shall any garage be erected except of
stone, brick or concrete that no lots fronting on sd. Herbert Street shall be erected within
25' of sd. Bldg. line and that on lots fronting on the sd. Ramona Avenue no dwelling shall
be erected within 30' of the bldg. line of sd. Ramona Avenue though enclosed porches
(temporary enclosures by screens and glass sashing excepted) may extend to within 20' of
sd. bldg. line and that as to the tracts first, second and third hereinbefore desc.(described)
resp. (respectively) no dwelling shall be erected on any lot having less than 25' front by 100'
in depth nor shall any garage be erected on any lot having less than 35' front by 100' in
depth that on the lots fourth, fifth, sixth and seventh desc., resp. not more than one
dwelling shall be erected on each.

Northwood Civic Association
The Northwood Civic Association received its charter of incorporation as a Pennsylvania not-for-profit corporation during a meeting held in City Hall, Room 577, Philadelphia, Pennsylvania, on Thursday, July 25, 1963, at 3:00 P.M., E.D.S.T., there being present: ISRAEL STIEFEL, ESQ., THE MASTER: BECKER & BECKER BY EDWARD R. BECKER, ESQ., For Petitioners.

J. WALTER KLINE testified:

This corporation was originally started in the spring of 1954, and the main purpose was to try and uphold the quality of the neighborhood – to keep real estate from being depreciated, to promote and preserve the civic, social and moral welfare of the community known as Northwood in the City of Philadelphia, to maintain and elevate the quality of land usage therein, to maintain and elevate the value of real estate therein, to prevent the infiltration of degrading and inharmonious land use therein, to do all other things necessary to preserve and maintain the amenities and high standards of the community, to engage in any peaceable activities including the institution of legal proceedings necessary for the promotion of the purposes, and this is a corporation which does not contemplate pecuniary gains or profit, incident or otherwise, to its members.

CONSTITUTION and BY-LAWS

NORTHWOOD CIVIC ASSOCIATION

Adopted October 19, 1976.  Effective February 15, 1978
(Amended May 19, 1981)

CONSTITUTION

ARTICLE I.  NAME and PURPOSE

Section 1.  The name of the Association shall be Northwood Civic Association.

Section 2.  The purpose of the Association shall be to promote civic, social, and moral welfare of the community: to preserve and maintain the amenities of the community and to peaceably protest inharmonious land uses which tend to detract from and reduce property values in the community and adjoining areas.

Section 3.  For the purposes of the Association, the boundaries of the community shall run along the East side of the Roosevelt Boulevard from the Southern line of Friends Hospital to Castor Avenue and Sanger Street; Sanger Street to Oxford Avenue; West side of Oxford Avenue to proximity of Leiper Street; proximity of Leiper Street to Orthodox Street; South side of Orthodox Street to Castor Avenue, Castor Avenue to Wyoming Avenue; Wyoming Avenue to Ramona Avenue; Ramona Avenue to Fishers Lane, Fishers Lane to the Southern line of Friends Hospital North to East side of Roosevelt Boulevard.

Note:
The historical records of the Northwood Civic Association are now dispersed in several state, local & private archives.

Crime
Frankford was the hunting ground for the "Frankford Slasher", who stalked victims between 1985 and 1990.

The intersection of Bridge Street and Hawthorne Street was listed number six in a 2007 list of the city's top ten recreational drug corners according to an article by Philadelphia Weekly reporter Steve Volk.

Demographics
Frankford is a diverse working-class neighborhood, containing a wide variety of ethnic groups, including a large number of Irish Americans, Polish Americans, Italian Americans, Portuguese Americans, Brazilian Americans, Arab Americans, African Americans, Hispanic Americans, specifically from Puerto Rico and the Dominican Republic, and West Indian Americans, mainly from Trinidad and Tobago, Jamaica and Haiti.

As of the census of 2010, the racial makeup of Frankford is 31.8% African American, 30.8% White, 29% Hispanic, and 8.4% other.

The population of Frankford grew by 3% between the 1990 and 2000 censuses.

Notable residents
Butch Ballard, jazz drummer and band leader
Edward R. Becker, Judge of the United States Court of Appeals for the Third Circuit.
Stephen Decatur Sr. for a time kept a home here.
Dr. Enoch Edwards, first medical student of Dr. Benjamin Rush, attending physician to General George Washington, also a correspondent to France for Jefferson and Monroe, kept a summer home here.
Earl G. Harrison, Dean of the University of Pennsylvania Law School; Commissioner of the United States Immigration and Naturalization Service, 1942–44
William Walker Foulkrod, US Congressman
Jeanette DuBois Meech (1835–1911), evangelist and industrial educator
James T. Nulty, Pennsylvania State Senator for the 8th district from 1911 to 1914
Dr. Benjamin Rush, Continental Congressman and signer of the American Declaration of Independence, had a summer home here.

Education
Frankford, like all areas of Philadelphia, is served by the School District of Philadelphia.  In particular Frankford High School has been the community's public high school since 1910.  In addition to public schools, Frankford Friends School, a private Pre-Kindergarten through 8th grade school, is in Frankford .  The Free Library of Philadelphia also operates the Frankford Branch in the neighborhood.

Sports
The community was the home of the Frankford Yellow Jackets, a National Football League team that won the championship in 1926 but folded in 1931. Frankford is also home to the N.E. Frankford Boys and Girls Club American Legion Post 224 Drill Team, who won the AMA Nationals Championship in 2005 and 2006.  Also part of the community for decades was the Frankford Boys Club.  It was an organization that gave Frankford youth an opportunity to learn how to play football, baseball and basketball as part of NESAC.  The Boys Club was one of NESAC flagship organizations and participated in many playoff games and championship victories.

See also

 Frankford Special Services District of Philadelphia

References

External links

"Under the El", Duane Swierczynski, Philadelphia City Paper
"Window of Opportunity on Frankford Business Strip", Tom Waring, Northeast Times
"Fond of Frankford", Diane Villano, Northeast Times
Philadelphia's New Frankford El Terminal
"Lydia Darragh", frankfordgazette.com
Historical Society of Frankford
“Frankford Chronicles Agent Lydia Darragh - Intelligence Operative”, Joseph J. Menkevich, "self publication"
"House and ground where the 1st "4th of July" was celebrated." Enoch Edwards, Womrath property; 4216 Frankford Ave.", ca 1870, P.9062.53b (Brenner) 7⅛" × 9½" Notes: Reduced image in HSP: Bd 862 N447, 6th Series with printed label.
Dripps, M. Map of the Township of Oxford, Boroughs of Frankford and Bridesburg, 1849.
Hopkins, G. M. City Atlas of Philadelphia, 23rd Ward, 1876 (includes Frankford)
 "Map of The Various Deed Restricted Tracts of Northwood"

 
Neighborhoods in Philadelphia
Municipalities in Philadelphia County prior to the Act of Consolidation, 1854
Populated places established in 1800
Populated places established in 1684
1854 disestablishments in Pennsylvania
German-American history
Irish-American neighborhoods
1682 establishments in Pennsylvania
1684 establishments in Pennsylvania